Albert Charles Houghton  (April 13, 1844 – August 11, 1914) was an American businessman and politician who served as the first mayor of North Adams, Massachusetts.

Biography
Albert Charles Houghton was born April 13, 1844, in Stamford, Vermont, to James and Chloe Houghton. He was the youngest son in a family of nine children.

Houghton married Cordelia J. Smith of Stamford in 1866. They had four children, all of whom studied in Germany.
 Houghton died as a result of injuries 11 days after a car accident that also killed his daughter Mary and her friend Sybil Cady Hutton. The chauffeur, John Widders, killed himself the next morning.

Businesses
Houghton was engaged in various business dealings. Before he was 21, he founded the Houghton Chemical Works of Stamford with his brother J.R. Houghton. By 1868, he was doing work in real estate and operating the Parker Mill in North Adams, Massachusetts. Houghton and his family moved to North Adams permanently in 1870.

Houghton owned the North Pownal Manufacturing Company in North Pownal, Vermont. He became president of the Arnold Print Works in 1881. He was president and owner of the A.J. Houghton Brewing Company of Boston, upon the death of founder A.J. Houghton in 1892. In 1877, he bought the Williamstown Manufacturing Company. In 1878 he bought the Eclipse Mill and Beaver Mill, both cotton manufacturing mills. In 1895 he became director of the Boston & Albany Railroad. He was also a trustee of Williams College and sat on the boards of various banks. Five days prior to his death in 1914, Houghton purchased the Mausert Block in Adams, Massachusetts.

Politics
In 1868, Houghton was a member of the state legislature in Vermont, representing his hometown of Searsburg. When North Adams was incorporated as a city in 1895, Houghton was nominated by "all parties" and elected its first mayor.

Notes

1844 births
Mayors of North Adams, Massachusetts
Road incident deaths in Massachusetts
Businesspeople from Massachusetts
1914 deaths
19th-century American politicians
19th-century American businesspeople
People from Stamford, Vermont